The Colón Department (in Spanish, Departamento Colón) is an administrative subdivision (departamento) of the province of Entre Ríos, Argentina. It is located in the center-east of the province, beside the Uruguay River.

The head town is Colón (population 21,000). Other cities and towns are San José, Ubajay, Villa Elisa, Pueblo Liebig, La Clarita, Arroyo Barú, Pueblo Cazes, Hocker and Hambis.

References

Complete Tourism Guide of Colón (Spanish)

External links

Departments of Entre Ríos Province